Nyrob is an urban locality (a work settlement) in Cherdynsky District of Perm Krai, Russia. Population:

Etymology
The name of settlement is a concatenation of Komi-Permyak words "ныр" (meaning "nose") and "ыб" (meaning "field"). With "Nose" being one of the first residents of the locality, the name as a whole can be translated as "a field belonging to Nose".

History
It was first mentioned in written sources in 1579.

It served as the administrative center of Nyrobsky District between February 27, 1924 and June 10, 1931 and then again between October 20, 1931 and November 4, 1959. Urban-type settlement status was granted to it in 1963.

Architecture
There are some architectural sights. One of them is Nikolskaya Church (completed in 1704); to the west of it there is also Bogoyavlenskaya Church (1736).

Transportation

References

Urban-type settlements in Perm Krai
Cherdynsky Uyezd